{{safesubst:#invoke:RfD|||month = March
|day = 13
|year = 2023
|time = 17:11
|timestamp = 20230313171102

|content=
redirectmultivitamin

}}